Deer Park Junior and Senior Public School is a school in the neighbourhood of Deer Park in Toronto, Ontario, Canada. The school serves students from kindergarten to grade eight, acting as an elementary and junior high school. It is on Ferndale Avenue, two blocks east of Yonge Street, just off St. Clair Avenue.

Programs
Deer Park offered the gifted program until 2010, when it was transferred to Forest Hill Collegiate Institute.

In addition to the regular curriculum Deer Park offers an integrated  special education program for children with physical disabilities.

External links
School website

Educational institutions in Canada with year of establishment missing
Elementary schools in Toronto
Middle schools in Toronto
Schools in the TDSB